Lars Bilet (8 January 1927 – 28 December 2016) was a Norwegian wrestler. He competed in the men's Greco-Roman middleweight at the 1952 Summer Olympics.

References

1927 births
2016 deaths
Norwegian male sport wrestlers
Olympic wrestlers of Norway
Wrestlers at the 1952 Summer Olympics
Sportspeople from Oslo